The diwata sphenomorphus (Sphenomorphus diwata)  is a species of skink found in the Philippines.

References

diwata
Reptiles described in 1967
Taxa named by Walter Creighton Brown
Taxa named by Dioscoro S. Rabor
Reptiles of the Philippines